Magnus Lidehäll is a Swedish award winning producer, composer and songwriter. He works close with songwriting duo Vargas & Lagola – with whom he won the composer of the year award at the Swedish Grammy Awards in 2014. Together they have produced, written, and/or co-written songs for Madonna, Wyclef Jean & Avicii ("Divine Sorrow"), Veronica Maggio and Petter, to name a few.

Career
Magnus Lidehäll started in a rap / hip hop duo alongside Herbert Munkhammar called Afasi & Filthy. "1990 Nånting", released with the band Snook in 2002, was their biggest hit. Between 2007-2008 he became a member of the successful formation Maskinen. He left Maskinen to focus on writing and producing music for other artists. Today he has a great resumé working with both international and local Swedish artists such as: Seinabo Sey, David Guetta, Katy Perry, Madonna, Silk City, Britney Spears and many more. He has also worked with producers such as Bloodshy & Avant and Sebastian Ingrosso.

Together with Bloodshy and Henrik Jonback Magnus co-wrote and produced "How I Roll" & "Trip To Your Heart" from Britney Spears's album Femme Fatale, which was released in March 2011.

On Katy Perry's 2013 album "Prism". he co-wrote and produced "Love Me" with Bloodshy, Vincent Pontare and Camela Leierth. He also co-wrote and produced the single "Don't Wait" from Mapei, released on Downtown Records in the same year as well as her 2014 debut album "Hey Hey".

Magnus played a key role in breaking Seinabo Sey, co-writing and producing all songs on her EP "For Madeleine", for which he was awarded producer of the year at 2015's Grammis (Swedish Grammy Awards), and her debut album "Pretend" and sophomore album "I'm A Dream" . He also collaborated on David Guetta's 2015 single "Bang My Head" (feat. Sia & Fetty Wap).

Since 2016 Magnus has released songs under his producer alias MagnusTheMagnus. The music turned out to fit perfectly for video and has been featured in campaigns for brands like Apple, Nike and Cartier.
"Area" and "Keep on Lovin’" were featured in the iPhone 8 and iPhone X reveals respectively, "Area" later led Billboard's Top TV Commercials Chart. One of his lesser known songs Calling was used in a Santander, a Polish bank, commercial, leading to an influx of Polish listeners who fondly remembered the commercial.

Studio Gottefar
Studio Gottefar is managed by Magnus Lindhäll, Vincent Pontare and Salem Al Fakir and is located in the old Traxton studios near Slussen in Stockholm, Sweden. Jonas Wikström, friend of the trio and head of A&R at Universal Music Publishing Group Scandinavia, described Gottefar as "a creative hub for working with diverse artists and projects".

Discography

References

External links
 ACSAP 2005
 All music
 Afasi & Filthy
 Style Of Eye & Magnus - Antidote

Swedish record producers
Living people
Musicians from Uppsala
1985 births